Shani Mahadevappa (1933 – 3 January 2021) was an Indian actor in the Kannada film industry. His films include Shankar Guru (1978), Kaviratna Kalidasa (1983), Sri Srinivasa Kalyana (1974), Shivashankar (1990), Guru Brahma (1992).

Career
Mahadevappa first became a theatre actor and worked in many theatrical groups including Gubbi Veeranna's company. His role of Lord Shani in the play Shani Prabhava brought him wider recognition and he became known as Shani Mahadevappa.

Death
Mahadevappa died from complications of COVID-19 in Bengaluru on 3 January 2021, at age 88, during the COVID-19 pandemic in India. He is survived by his son and daughter.

Selected filmography

 Aathma Bandhana (1992)
 Mana Mecchida Sose (1992)
 Shivashankar (1990)
 Ramarajyadalli Rakshasaru (1990)
 Onti Salaga (1989)
 Jayasimha (1987)
 Sathyam Shivam Sundaram (1987)
 Jeevana Jyothi (1987)
 Madhuve Madu Tamashe Nodu (1986)
 Kaviratna Kalidasa (1983)
 Premada Kanike (1976)
 Thrimurthy (1975)

Awards
 Varadaraju Award 2009
 Rajkumar Souharda Award

See also

List of people from Karnataka
Cinema of Karnataka
List of Indian film actors
Cinema of India

References

External links
 
 Shani Mahadevappa honored

1933 births
2021 deaths
Male actors in Kannada cinema
Indian male film actors
Male actors from Karnataka
20th-century Indian male actors
21st-century Indian male actors
Place of birth missing
Deaths from the COVID-19 pandemic in India
People from Mandya district